The Phantom of Morrisville is a Czech comedy film directed by Bořivoj Zeman. It was released in 1966.

Plot
The movie is a parody on Western mystical thrillers and horror films, in particular—1961 film The Pit and the Pendulum. A musician from the symphony orchestra reads an English thriller novel during the concert, while performing his parts of the Georges Bizet's opera Carmen. The book makes so strong an impression on him that he imagines himself to be the novel's protagonist, Sir Hannibal Morris, an owner of a huge Gothic castle. Then come mysterious murders and disappearances, intrigues, kidnappings, and love.

Cast
 Oldřich Nový as Drummer Emil / Sir Hannibal Morris
 Květa Fialová as Lady Clarence Hamilton – Hanibal's fiancée
 Jana Novaková as Mabel – Hanibal's secretary
 Vít Olmer as Allan Pinkerton
 Waldemar Matuška as Manuel Díaz – adventurer
 Jaroslav Marvan as Inspector Brumpby from Scotland Yard
 František Filipovský as Doctor Stolly
 Jan Skopeček as Servant John
 Jaroslav Rozsíval as Dixi
 Jaroslav Heyduk as Drummond – called 'Ruzenka'
 Otto Šimánek as Miky – called 'Kuratko' ('Chicken')
 Vlasta Fabianová as Arabella – the Gray Lady
 Lubomír Kostelka as Ind Abu – guardian tigers
 Rudolf Deyl as Coroner
 Nataša Gollová as Lady White – shelter owner for incorrigible criminal
 Hamm as The Lead Jannie

External links
 

1966 films
1966 comedy films
Czechoslovak black-and-white films
Czech comedy films
Films set in the 19th century
Cultural depictions of Allan Pinkerton
Czech parody films
1960s Czech-language films